Hugh Birch Grundy (born 6 March 1945) is an English musician. In a career spanning more than 50 years, Grundy came to prominence in the mid 1960s as the drummer of the English rock band the Zombies. He was inducted into the Rock and Roll Hall of Fame in 2019.

Early years
Hugh Grundy was born in Winchester, Hampshire, England, to Ted and Aileen Grundy. The family moved to Hatfield, Hertfordshire, where Ted worked at the De Havilland factory as an aircraft inspector and metallurgist; he was also an amateur violinist. Aileen was a secretary at the police headquarters in Welwyn Garden City. Grundy's middle name, Birch, was his paternal grandmother's maiden name. His first drum was made by his father at work during his off-hours.

While attending St Albans School in Hertfordshire, he met Paul Atkinson, and Rod Argent. Argent, Atkinson and Grundy first played together at a jam on Easter 1961 in St Albans, Hertfordshire.

The Zombies
Argent wanted to form a band and Colin Blunstone and Paul Arnold joined in early 1961, while all five members were still at school. Grundy's parents supported his interest in the band as a pastime, but encouraged him to enter banking; he remained with Barclays for around a year, as the band's reputation grew, at which stage his parents acknowledged the viability of a career in music. His mother helped to establish, and ran, the band's fan club. Arnold left not long afterwards and was replaced by Chris White. The band started life as the Mustangs, but after discovering other bands using the name, they changed it to the Zombies. After the band won a local contest, they recorded a demo as their prize. Argent's song "She's Not There" got them a recording contract with Decca.

Later career
The Zombies had several hits and continued to record but they broke up in December 1967, reportedly over management disagreements. After the band's break-up, Grundy went to work as an A&R man for Columbia Records. In the 1980s, Grundy also operated a horse-transport business in England and worked as a professional driver.

In 1990, Blunstone, Grundy, and White briefly reunited as the Zombies with keyboardist and guitarist Sebastian Santa Maria to record the studio album New World (1991). To mark the 40th anniversary of the album Odessey and Oracle, the four surviving original members of the Zombies participated in a three-night series of concerts at London's Shepherd's Bush Empire Theatre between 7 and 9 March 2008.

Together with the other three Zombies, Grundy performed a few songs when the band was inducted into the Rock and Roll Hall of Fame on 29 March, 2019.

Discography

The Zombies

Studio albums
Begin Here (UK) / The Zombies (US) (1965)
Odessey and Oracle (1968)
The Return of the Zombies (1990)/New World (1991)
Still Got That Hunger (2015)
Different Game (2023)

EPs
The Zombies (1964)

Singles

References

External links

1945 births
Living people
British male drummers
English rock drummers
English record producers
The Zombies members
Musicians from Hertfordshire
People educated at St Albans School, Hertfordshire